Manari may refer to:

 Manari, Pernambuco, municipality in the State of Pernambunco, Brazil
 Manari, Greece, settlement in Arcadia, Greece
 Manari, Guyana, in Barima-Waini region
 Manari, Nepal, district in Nepal